Leo Robert Floyd (February 27, 1911 – August 30, 1977), commonly known as "Leo Hannibal" and nicknamed "Hippo", was an American Negro league pitcher in the 1930s.

A native of Indianapolis, Indiana, Hannibal was the son of fellow Negro leaguer Jack Hannibal. He made his Negro leagues debut in 1932 with the Indianapolis ABCs, and went on to play for the Indianapolis Athletics, Homestead Grays, and Memphis Red Sox. Hannibal died in Indianapolis in 1977 at age 66.

References

External links
 and Seamheads

1911 births
1977 deaths
Homestead Grays players
Indianapolis ABCs (1931–1933) players
Indianapolis Athletics players
Memphis Red Sox players
20th-century African-American sportspeople